The following highways in Virginia have been known as State Route 11:
 State Route 11 (Virginia 1918-1933), originally Cumberland Gap to near Bluefield, West Virginia
 U.S. Route 11 in Virginia, 1926–present